Zeniontidae is a family of large, showy, deep-bodied zeiform marine fish. Found in the Atlantic, Indian, and Pacific Ocean, the family contains just seven species in three genera.

The family was formerly known as Macrurocyttidae.

References

 
Ray-finned fish families
Zeiformes